The Watuppa Branch (also called the North Dartmouth Industrial Track, and formerly the Fall River Branch) is a roughly six-mile freight railroad line in southeastern Massachusetts. The track originates at Mount Pleasant Junction, where it diverges from the New Bedford Secondary, and runs through Dartmouth before terminating in north Westport. The line is owned by the Massachusetts Department of Transportation and is operated by Bay Colony Railroad, which interchanges with Massachusetts Coastal Railroad at the junction in New Bedford. The abandoned western portion of the right-of-way is used by the Quequechan River Rail Trail.

Route 

The Watuppa Branch originates in New Bedford, where it diverges from the New Bedford Secondary and passes beneath MA Route 140. After traveling through the western portion of downtown New Bedford, the railroad crosses into Dartmouth and travels just north of downtown, passing through the "Dartmouth Business Park II" before crossing into Westport. After crossing the border, the track passes beneath Interstate 195 and continues for just over a mile, until passing beneath MA Route 88, at which point active trackage ends and only abandoned, disused track remains. The disused track continues for another short distance until it terminates near Watuppa Ponds, at which point the Quequechan River Rail Trail eventually takes over where the track formerly laid.

History 

The Fall River Railroad was chartered in 1874 and opened in 1875 from the New Bedford Railroad at New Bedford to Fall River through the towns of Dartmouth and Westport. The line was built to provide rail access to the mills in the eastern part of Fall River along the Quequechan River valley. The western terminus of the line was located Watuppa Station at Plymouth Avenue near Front Street. In 1882 the line was leased to the Old Colony Railroad for 99 years, but sold outright to the Old Colony in 1896. At some point following the closure of Old Colony Railroad, the track between Westport and Fall River was removed; the current track ends shortly after the Massachusetts Route 88 crossing in the town of Westport.

Beginning in 1982, Bay Colony Railroad took over all freight operations on the line. While most of Bay Colony's operations were subsequently taken over by Massachusetts Coastal Railroad in 2007, the Watuppa branch remains under the operation of Bay Colony. 

In 2008, the first section of the Quequechan Rail Trail opened over a portion of the former Fall River Railroad right-of-way along the shore of South Watuppa Pond east of Brayton Avenue at a cost of $462,000. It was later extended west to Britland Park and Rodman Street. State funding was awarded in 2022 for a  extension east to the Westport town line.

References

External links

 Quequechan River Rail Trail Map
 Alfred J. Lima Quequechan River Rail Trail
Old Colony Railroad lines
Railway lines